Eylaidae is a family of prostigs in the order Trombidiformes. There is at least one genus, Eylais, and about six described species in Eylaidae.

References

Further reading

 
 
 
 

Trombidiformes
Acari families